Big Jay is a  mountain in the northern Green Mountains of Vermont, located on the border of Franklin and Orleans counties.

The summit of Big Jay is the highest point of Franklin County.  Big Jay is flanked to the south by Little Jay, and to the northeast by Jay Peak, the highest summit of the Jay Peak complex.
Jay Peak is named for John Jay (1745–1829) of New York, one of the founding fathers of the United States.

Big Jay stands within the watershed of the Trout River, a tributary of the Missisquoi River, which drains into Lake Champlain, thence into Canada's Richelieu River, the Saint Lawrence River, and into the Gulf of Saint Lawrence.
The east and southeast sides of Big Jay drain into Jay Brook, which joins the South Branch Trout River in Montgomery to form the Trout River.  The southwest and western sides of Big Jay drain into Hannah Clark Brook, and thence into the Trout.  The northern end of Big Jay drains into Black Falls Brook, and thence into the Trout.

There is no official hiking trail on Big Jay, although there is a herd path to the summit from Jay Peak.  There is also a summit register.  In the summer of 2007 two men cut an illegal ski trail several hundred yards down the eastern side of the protected habitat.  The offense carries a maximum $5,000 fine and five years in jail. Hikers and skiers have been encouraged to stay away from the scar caused by the vandalism so that the area can recover.

See also 
 List of mountains in Vermont
 New England Hundred Highest

References

External links 
 

Mountains of Vermont
New England Hundred Highest
Landforms of Franklin County, Vermont
Landforms of Orleans County, Vermont